Hungary competed at the 1904 Summer Olympics in St. Louis, United States. Austrian and Hungarian results at early Olympic Games are generally kept separate despite the union of the two nations as Austria-Hungary at the time.



Medalists

The following Hungarian competitors won medals at the games. In the discipline sections below, the medalists' names are bolded.

| width=78% align=left valign=top |

Default sort order: Medal, Date, Name

| style="text-align:left; width:22%; vertical-align:top;"|

Multiple medalists
The following competitors won multiple medals at the 1904 Olympic Games.

Competitors

| width=78% style="text-align:left; vertical-align:top" |

The following is the list of number of competitors participating in the Games:

| width="22%" style="text-align:left; vertical-align:top" |

The following is the list of dates, when Hungary won medals:

Athletics

Men
Track & road events

Field events

Swimming

Men

Note
1Halmay tied with Leary in the final. A swim-off was held between them, which Halmay won and was awarded with the gold medal. His time was 28.0, Leary's time was 28.6.

References
Official Olympic Reports
International Olympic Committee results database

Nations at the 1904 Summer Olympics
1904
Olympics